Gene Borrello (born June 6, 1984) is an Italian-American criminal and former Bonanno crime family associate. He later became a government witness, agreeing to testify against crime family members Vincent Asaro and Ronald Giallanzo in 2016.

Borrello led a violent and brazen home invasion crew in Howard Beach, Queens, before he was arrested for his role in September 2014. In 2016, Borrello agreed to become a government witness, testifying against several Bonanno members, including Vincent Asaro. Asaro had tasked Borrello with burning the car of a man in a severe road rage case.

In 2019, Borrello was released from prison after being sentenced to time served for his cooperation. Following his release, he publicly denounced organized crime and became a podcaster and book author, and often brags about his life of crime during interviews.

In February 2021, Borrello was once again arrested for making violent threats towards his ex-girlfriend and her family. He was released on June 21, 2021.

References

Living people
1984 births
Bonanno crime family
American podcasters
American people of Italian descent
American writers of Italian descent
American motivational speakers